TWA Flight 903 was a regularly scheduled flight from Bombay International Airport, India to New York-Idlewild Airport, via Cairo-King Farouk Airport and Rome-Ciampino Airport.

Flight 
The Star of Maryland, a Lockheed L-749A Constellation, flew the route on the night of 31 August 1950. It departed Cairo at 23:35 for Rome with 55 persons aboard, (48 passengers and seven crew members), in good weather.

As the plane was returning to Cairo, the engine separated from the aircraft, forcing the crew to attempt a forced landing in the desert about 65 miles NNW of Cairo. The airliner went down near the village of Itay El Barud at the rim of the Western Desert, killing all 55 on board. 

Searchers found the wreckage strewn over  after trekking  over hot sands to reach it, where the aircraft wreckage was found almost completely burnt out. The bodies of the victims were badly charred, delaying identification. A United Press International correspondent reported that the plane had smashed into a narrow-gauge railway in hitting the ground and had plowed up a considerable stretch of track.

Among those killed were Egyptian film star Camelia; Polish architect Maciej Nowicki, who had been working on the design of the new city of Chandigarh; and Indian mathematician S. S. Pillai, who was on his way to participate in the International Congress of Mathematicians at Harvard University.

Investigation 
After an intensive investigation, the probable cause of the crash was cited to be failure of the rear master rod bearing on the number three engine. The failure caused the rear crankpin to overheat and fail, whereupon all the rear connecting rods failed, tearing through the cylinder walls and crankcase. In the process, oil lines were torn open, which caused the fire. Sludge buildup in the crankpins, blocking oil flow was thought to be the root cause, which resulted in improved oil screens and the implementation of a crankpin plug, as well as revised oil change intervals.

See also
 List of accidents and incidents involving commercial aircraft

References
Notes

External links
 

903
Airliner accidents and incidents caused by in-flight fires
Airliner accidents and incidents caused by mechanical failure
Aviation accidents and incidents in Egypt
Aviation accidents and incidents in 1950
1950 in Egypt
Accidents and incidents involving the Lockheed Constellation
August 1950 events in Africa
Airliner accidents and incidents caused by engine failure
Airliner accidents and incidents involving in-flight engine separations